The Battle of Cēsis (Battle of Võnnu; , Battle of Wenden), fought near Cēsis (or Võnnu, Wenden) in June 1919, was a decisive battle in the Estonian War of Independence and the Latvian War of Independence. After heavy fighting an Estonian force moving from the north, supplemented by Latvian units, repelled Baltic German attacks and went on full counter-attack.

Background
Latvia had declared independence in 1918, but was unable to stop the advance of the Red Army, resulting in the loss of Riga. The advance of the Red Latvian Riflemen was stopped by the German VI Reserve Corps. The Reserve Corps under general Rüdiger von der Goltz consisted of the Baltische Landeswehr, the Freikorps Iron Division, and the Guard Reserve Division. The Latvian volunteers loyal to the Provisional Government were also placed under the command of the Baltische Landeswehr. On 16 April 1919, the Latvian government of Kārlis Ulmanis was toppled by the Germans, who installed a puppet German Provisional Government of Latvia headed by Andrievs Niedra. However, the Latvian Brigade led by Jānis Balodis remained passively under the German command.

After recapturing Riga from the Red Army, the VI Reserve Corps continued its advance north. At the same time, the 3rd Estonian Division, having pushed the Soviets out of south Estonia, was advancing into Latvia from the north. Estonia continued to recognise the Ulmanis government, and neither side was ready to back down. On 5 June, fighting started, with the Landeswehr capturing Cēsis the following day. On 10 June with the mediation of the Allies a ceasefire was declared, but talks failed, and on 19 June fighting recommenced.

Battle

On 19 June, fighting resumed with an Iron Division attack on the Estonian positions near Limbaži. At that time, the 3rd Estonian Division, including the 2nd Latvian Cēsis Regiment under Colonel Krišjānis Berķis, had 5,990 infantry and 125 cavalry. The pro-German forces had 5,500–6,300 infantry, 500–600 cavalry and a strong advantage in cannons, machine guns and mortars. German forces achieved some success around Limbaži, but were soon pushed back. The situation became critical for the 3rd Estonian Division, but the German assault was stopped by three Estonian armoured trains and the Kuperjanov Partisan Battalion.

The Landeswehr continued attacking at several parts of the front, and more Estonian forces joined the battle. After stopping the last German attacks, the Estonian forces started a full counter-attack on 23 June resulting in the recapture of Cēsis. The German units started a general retreat toward Riga.

Aftermath

The Battle of Cēsis was a decisive victory for Estonia against the pro-German forces. The 3rd Estonian Division continued their advance towards Riga. On 3 July, the Estonian forces were at the outskirts of the city. Estonia, Latvia and the pro-German Provisional Government of Latvia signed the Ceasefire of Strazdumuiža on the demand of the Entente. The armistice restored the Ulmanis government in Riga. German forces were ordered to leave Latvia, the Baltic-German Landeswehr was put under command of the Latvian government and sent to fight against the Red Army. However, to circumvent Entente's orders, many German soldiers instead of leaving, were incorporated into the West Russian Volunteer Army. Fighting in Latvia and Lithuania restarted in October and continued until December 1919.

Estonia celebrates the anniversary of the battle as Victory Day, a national holiday. Common annual commemoration events of the battle are held on 22 June (Latvia's Victory Day) at the Freedom Monument in Cēsis, Latvia.

See also
Latvian War of Independence
Estonian War of Independence
Baltische Landeswehr
Freikorps in the Baltic

Citations and references

Cited sources

External links
 Eriks Jekabsons: Cesis, Battle of, in: 1914-1918-online. International Encyclopedia of the First World War.

Cēsis
Conflicts in 1919
1919 in Latvia
Battles of the Estonian War of Independence
Battles involving Latvia
Military history of Latvia
June 1919 events
Independence of Latvia